P. phyllostachydis may refer to:
 Phyllachora phyllostachydis, a fungus species
 Polyporus phyllostachydis, a fungus species growing on dead bamboo shoots
 Puccinia phyllostachydis, Kusano, the bamboo rust, a fungus species of the genus Puccinia

See also
 Phyllostachydis (disambiguation)